Kenji Kubo (born 4 April 1989), also known simply as KENJI, is a Japanese kickboxer and former professional boxer. He is the 2017 K-1 Super Bantamweight Grand Prix finalist, the 2011 RISE Bantamweight champion and the 2007 NJKF Flyweight champion.

Kickboxing career

K-1
Kubo returned to K-1 in 2017, and was immediately scheduled to take part in the 2017 K-1 Super Bantamweight Grand Prix. It was his first kickboxing bout in nearly five years. Kubo beat Suen Tak Chuen by an extra round unanimous decision in the quarterfinals, and Nobuchika Terado by a second-round knockout in the semifinals. Kubo fought Yoshiki Takei in the finals, and lost the fight by unanimous decision.

After he finished as the runner-up in the Super Bantamweight Grand Prix, Kubo was scheduled to fight a rematch with Nobuchika Terado for the Krush Super Bantamweight title, at Krush 82. The fight was declared a draw after three rounds, and went into an extra round, after which Terado won a unanimous decision.

Kubo was scheduled to fight a rematch with Yoshiki Takei for the K-1 Super Bantamweight title at K-1: K'FESTA.1. Takei won the fight by knockout midway through the first round.

Titles and accomplishments
K-1 World GP Japan
 2017 K-1 World GP Super Bantamweight Championship Tournament Runner-up

RISE
 2011 RISE Bantamweight Champion

New Japan Kickboxing Federation
 2007 NJKF Flyweight Champion

World Professional Muaythai Federation
 2007 WPMO World Flyweight Champion

Professional kickboxing record

|-style="background:#fbb;"
| 2018-03-21 || Loss|| align=left| Yoshiki Takei || K-1 World GP 2018: K'FESTA.1 || Saitama, Japan || KO (Right Hook) || 1 || 1:27
|-  
! style=background:white colspan=9 |
|-  style="background:#fbb;"
| 2017-11-05|| Loss||align=left| Nobuchika Terado || Krush.82 || Tokyo, Japan || Ext.R Decision (Unanimous) || 4 || 3:00
|-
! style=background:white colspan=9 |
|-  bgcolor="#fbb"
| 2017-04-22 || Loss|| align=left| Yoshiki Takei || K-1 World GP 2017: Super Bantamweight Tournament, Final || Tokyo, Japan || Decision (Unanimous) || 3 || 3:00
|-
! style=background:white colspan=9 |
|-  style="background:#cfc;"
| 2017-04-22|| Win||align=left| Nobuchika Terado || K-1 World GP 2017: Super Bantamweight Tournament, Semi Finals || Tokyo, Japan || KO (Left Straight) || 2 || 3:00
|-  style="background:#cfc;"
| 2017-04-22|| Win||align=left| Suen Tak Chuen || K-1 World GP 2017: Super Bantamweight Tournament, Quarter Finals || Tokyo, Japan || Ext.R Decision (Unanimous)|| 4 || 3:00
|-  bgcolor="#cfc"
| 2012-06-06 || Win||align=left| Franck Gross || RISE 88||  Tokyo, Japan|| KO (Left Hook to the Body) ||3|| 0:29
|-  bgcolor="#cfc"
| 2012-06-06 || Win ||align=left| Mikihito Yamagami || RISE 87||  Tokyo, Japan|| Decision (Unanimous) ||3|| 3:00
|-  bgcolor="#cfc"
| 2012-01-29 || Win ||align=left| Pajonsuk Por.Pramuk || RISE 86||  Tokyo, Japan|| Decision (Unanimous) ||3|| 3:00
|-  bgcolor="#cfc"
| 2011-11-23 || Win ||align=left| Dyki || RISE 85||  Tokyo, Japan|| KO (Left hook to the body) ||1|| 1:35
|-
! style=background:white colspan=9 |
|-  bgcolor="#cfc"
| 2011-09-23 || Win ||align=left| Ryuma Tobe || RISE 83||  Tokyo, Japan|| Decision (Majority) ||3|| 3:00
|-  bgcolor="#cfc"
| 2011-08-21 || Win ||align=left| Keiichita Matsumoto || Bigbang 6||  Tokyo, Japan|| KO (Left High Kick) ||2|| 2:49
|-  bgcolor="#cfc"
| 2011-05-27 || Win ||align=left| Shin Jyu Oh || Survivor～Round.7～||  Tokyo, Japan|| TKO (Punches) ||1|| 2:26
|-  style="background:#fbb;"
| 2011-04-30|| Loss||align=left| Shota Takiya || Krush Inaugural Championship Tournament ～Triple Final Round～Semi Final || Tokyo, Japan ||Ext.R Decision (Unanimous) || 4 || 3:00
|-  style="background:#cfc;"
| 2010-12-12|| Win||align=left| Kazuki Tanaka || Krush Inaugural Championship Tournament Quarter Final || Tokyo, Japan || KO (Left Hook) || 2 || 0:55
|-  style="background:#cfc;"
| 2010-10-08|| Win||align=left| Hiroaki Mizuhara || Survivor 〜Round.5〜 || Tokyo, Japan ||Decision (Majority) || 3 ||3:00
|-  style="background:#cfc;"
| 2010-07-18|| Win||align=left| Kentaro Kimura || Survivor 〜Round.4〜 || Tokyo, Japan ||Decision (Unanimous) || 3 ||3:00
|-  style="background:#cfc;"
| 2010-05-27|| Win||align=left| Akitaka Sugiyama || Krush 7 || Tokyo, Japan || KO (Left Hook) || 1 || 2:34
|-  style="background:#fbb;"
| 2010-03-13|| Loss||align=left| Nobuchika Terado || Krush × Survivor|| Tokyo, Japan || KO (Punches) || 2 || 2:26
|-  style="background:#cfc;"
| 2010-01-25|| Win ||align=left| Shin Yoshida || Survivor～Round.3～|| Tokyo, Japan || KO (Right Cross)  || 1 || 1:40
|-  style="background:#fbb;"
| 2009-12-09|| Loss||align=left| Shota Takiya|| Survivor～Round.2～ || Tokyo, Japan ||Decision (Majority) || 3 ||3:00
|-  style="background:#cfc;"
| 2009-09-28|| Win ||align=left| Taisuke Degai || Survivor～Round.1～|| Tokyo, Japan || Decision (Split)  || 3 || 3:00
|-  style="background:#fbb;"
| 2008-05-14|| Loss||align=left| Wanphet Phetputhon || Rajadamnern Stadium || Bangkok, Thailand ||Decision || 5 ||3:00
|-  style="background:#cfc;"
| 2007-11-21|| Win ||align=left|  || || Phnom Penh, Cambodia || Decision   ||  ||
|-  style="background:#cfc;"
| 2007-09-02|| Win ||align=left| Lee Hi Do  || NJKF FIGHTING EVOLUTION X || Tokyo, Japan || TKO (Towel thrown/Low Kick) || 1 || 2:38
|-
! style=background:white colspan=9 |
|-  style="background:#cfc;"
| 2007-07-13|| Win ||align=left| Nakbin Patong gym|| Bangla Stadium || Patong, Thailand || KO (Elbow)  || 2 || 
|-
! style=background:white colspan=9 |
|-  style="background:#cfc;"
| 2007-05-13|| Win ||align=left| Yusuke Nakanishi  || NJKF FIGHTING EVOLUTION VI || Tokyo, Japan || TKO (Doctor Stoppage) || 3 || 2:49
|-  style="background:#cfc;"
| 2007-03-18|| Win ||align=left| Daisuke  || NJKF FIGHTING EVOLUTION III || Tokyo, Japan || KO (Low Kick) || 2 || 3:00
|-  style="background:#cfc;"
| 2007-01-28|| Win ||align=left| Samingnum SKV gym|| NJKF FIGHTING EVOLUTION II || Tokyo, Japan || KO || 2 || 2:11
|-  style="background:#cfc;"
| 2006-11-23|| Win ||align=left| Naoki Ootsuki|| NJKF || Tokyo, Japan || TKO (Doctor Stoppage) || 3 || 2:58
|-  style="background:#cfc;"
| 2006-09-17|| Win ||align=left| Rose Tasuya|| TRIAL LEAGUE.7	|| Tokyo, Japan || TKO (3 Knockdowns) || 2 || 2:43
|-
| colspan=9 | Legend:    

|-style="background:#fbb;"
| 2007-12-31 || Loss|| align=left| Yudai || K-1 PREMIUM 2007 Dynamite!! K-1 Koshien Tournament Semi Final || Osaka, Japan || Decision (Unanimous) || 3 || 3:00
|-
| colspan=9 | Legend:

Professional boxing record

See also
 List of male kickboxers

References

Living people
1989 births
Japanese male kickboxers
Japanese male boxers
Bantamweight boxers
Flyweight kickboxers
Bantamweight kickboxers
People from Tachikawa